Pinus glabra, the spruce pine,  is a tree found on the coastal plains of the southern United States, from southern South Carolina south to northern Florida and west to southern Louisiana.

The leaves are needle-like, in bundles of two, slender, and glossy dark green.

Pinus glabra differs markedly from most other pines in that it does not occur in largely pure pine forests, but is typically found as scattered trees in moist woodland habitats in mixed hardwood forest. To be able to compete successfully in such habitats, it has adapted to greater shade tolerance than most other pines.

References

External links
 
 
What Is A Cedar Pine: Tips On Planting Cedar Pine Hedges

Trees of the Southeastern United States
glabra
Least concern plants
Trees of the United States